Ailanthus triphysa (also Ailanthus malabarica) is a medium to tall evergreen rainforest tree in  Asia and Australia. The wood may be used for matchwood and plywood. The tree is known as halmaddi in India, where its resin, also called halmaddi, may be used in incense. Inappropriate extraction methods were resulting in trees dying, so by the 1990s the Indian forestry department had banned extraction.

Distribution
It occurs in India, including the Andaman Islands; Sri Lanka; Sri Lanka; Myanmar; South-Central and Southeast China; Thailand; Laos; Malaysia, including Peninsular Malaysia, Sarawak and Sabah; Cambodia; Vietnam; Philippines; Jawa, Kalimantan, Sulawesi and Maluku in Indonesia; and Australia.
In Australia, Ailanthus triphysa occurs as two isolated populations in Western Australia (at Prince Regent River and on the offshore Coronation Island, in the Kimberley), and from Cape York in Queensland and as far south as the Susan Island Nature Reserve at Clarence River (New South Wales).

Description 
A medium to tall evergreen tree to 30 m and diameter of 1.2 m. The trunk is not buttressed, but rather straight and cylindrical. The bark is grey, somewhat rough and resembling sandpaper to the touch. Leaves are pinnate, curved and sickle shaped drawn out to a point. Particularly oblique at the base. Venation is prominent, the net veins more obvious under the leaf. Flowers are creamy green, flowering in November to January in Australia. The fruit is a samara, often forming in threes.

Stem: Bark greyish, lenticellate; blaze yellow with red speckles.

Leaves:
Leaf bearing twigs 1 cm or more in diameter. Stipules very small Leaflet blades falcate, about 5-12 x 0.9–2 cm, very unequal-sided particularly at the base. Lateral veins forming loops well inside the blade margin. Midrib raised in a depression on the upper surface of the leaflet blade. Numerous, closely spaced oil dots visible with a lens.

Flowers:
These are polygamous with greenish yellow in color . Inflorescence axillary, branched panicle, about 10–20 cm long. Sepals are about 0.5-0.8 mm long. Petals are about 3.5-4.5 x 2 mm in dimensions, Stamen are about 3–4 mm long in male flowers, and carpels are 2-4mm usually 3mm long. Ovules 1 per carpel
Flowering season in India are from the month of December to May.
Fruit:
Fruits green to greenish brown, papery in texture. Samaras about 5-6 x 1–2 cm. Main vascular bundle to the seed connected to an intramarginal vein on the samara.

Habitat
On the island of Yamdena, eastern Indonesia, the tree occurs in Dense Dry Deciduous Forest, growing in the understorey, taller than 4m with a dbh less than 30cm. The canopy of these forests is dominated by Ebenaceae (particularly Diospyros) and Fabaceae.
On Coronation Island, off the coast of the Kimberley, Western Australia, the tree grows in vine thickets (monsoon rainforest pockets). Because of the limited and isolated nature of the Western Australian populations, they have conservation significance.

Uses 

The wood is yellowish and brittle; as well as making excellent charcoal, the timber may be used for matchwood and plywood.
When the bark is cut, a sticky resin is exuded, which becomes brittle on drying; this resin may be used for medicinal purposes, and particularly, because of its aromatic nature, it may be burned as incense, either directly, or as an ingredient in incense sticks. In India. the incense resin is named halmaddi, after the local name for the tree itself. Due to crude extraction methods which resulted in trees dying, by the 1990s the Forest Department in India had banned resin extraction; this forced up the price of halmaddi, and its use in incense-making declined.
In Cambodia, the resin is also used as incense, whereas the bark is used in local folk medicine against dysentery and intestinal œdema.

The wood contain various alkaloids and quassinoids, including beta-carboline, and has been used for the treatment of dyspepsia, bronchitis, ophthalmia and snake bite.

Names
As well as its botanical names, this tree has common, or vernacular, names. These include: halmaddi, but, in India; hoëm thôm (Khmer, ="severe œdema"); thanh thât (Vietnam); white bean, ferntop ash (Australia).

References

Further reading
  (other publication details, included in citation)

triphysa
Flora of tropical Asia
Trees of Australia
Trees of China